The Tombe à la fille (Girl's tomb) is a small tomb located in the woods of Teillay, Brittany, France. According to local tradition, a girl killed by the Chouans during the French revolution is buried there. Today it is a place of great devotion in the region. The tomb is regularly covered with flowers, and children's clothes are always hung on the surrounding vegetation.

History 

The girl buried there was Marie Martin, born in Tresboeuf and living in Teillay; at the time of death she was 17 to 19 years old. Although several narratives exist about the reason for her murder, one of the most credited claims is that she would have indicated to the Republicans of Bain-de-Bretagne the hiding place of a group of Chouans (or, on the contrary, refused to indicate the hiding place of the revolutionaries).

She was captured and tortured for a long time by the Chouans, who let her die whilst tied to a tree.

This girl is also remembered as Sainte Pataude (clumsy); clumsy is the nickname given to the Republicans by the Chouans in Gallo (patao).;

Bibliography 
 Jean-Claude Schmitt, Les Saints et les stars: le texte hagiographique dans la culture populaire: études, Parigi, Beauchesne, 1983, .
 Frank Tallett,Catholicism in Britain & France Since 1789, Londra e Rio Grande, The Hambledon Press, 1996, .
 Caroline C. Ford, Divided Houses: Religion and Gender in Modern France, Ithaca e Londra, Cornell University Press, 2005, .

Notes

External links 

1795 sculptures
Granite sculptures in France
Tombs
Brittany